Methylocapsa is a genus of bacteria from the family of Beijerinckiaceae. M. gorgona has been shown to metabolize significant amounts of atmospheric methane.

References

 

Beijerinckiaceae
Bacteria genera